The 2014–15 Nemzeti Bajnokság I is the 64th season of the Nemzeti Bajnokság I, Hungary's premier Handball league.

Team information 

The following 12 clubs compete in the NB I during the 2014–15 season:

Personnel and kits
Following is the list of clubs competing in 2014–15 Nemzeti Bajnokság I, with their president, head coach, kit manufacturer and shirt sponsor.

Regular season

Standings

Pld - Played; W - Won; D - Drawn; L - Lost; GF - Goals for; GA - Goals against; Diff - Difference; Pts - Points.

Schedule and results
In the table below the home teams are listed on the left and the away teams along the top.

Championship playoff 
Teams in bold won the playoff series. Numbers to the left of each team indicate the team's original playoff seeding. Numbers to the right indicate the score of each playoff game.

Semifinals

1st leg

2nd leg

FTC-Rail Cargo Hungária won series 2–0 and advanced to the final.

Győri Audi ETO KC won series 2–0 and advanced to the final.

Final
1st leg

2nd leg

FTC-Rail Cargo Hungária won Championship final series 2–0.

5th – 8th placement

Standings

Pld - Played; W - Won; D - Drawn; L - Lost; GF - Goals for; GA - Goals against; Diff - Difference; Pts - Points.

Schedule and results
In the table below the home teams are listed on the left and the away teams along the top.

Relegation round

Standings

Pld - Played; W - Won; D - Drawn; L - Lost; GF - Goals for; GA - Goals against; Diff - Difference; Pts - Points.

Schedule and results
In the table below the home teams are listed on the left and the away teams along the top.

Season statistics

Top goalscorers
Updated to games played on 24 May 2015.

Source:

Number of teams by counties

NB I clubs in 2014–15 European competitions

 Győri Audi ETO KC

 FTC-Rail Cargo Hungária

 Érd

 Dunaújvárosi Kohász KA

 Siófoki KC-Galerius Fürdő

Final standing

References

External links
 Hungarian Handball Federaration 

Nemzeti Bajnokság I (women's handball)
2014–15 domestic handball leagues
Nemzeti Bajnoksag I Women
2014 in women's handball
2015 in women's handball